Tour Aurore is a 110-metre, 29-story office building in the La Defense central business district outside of Paris. It was designed by Coyne et Bellier and constructed in 1970 but will be dismantled in 2013 to make way for Tour Air2.

External links
Tour Aurore (Emporis)

La Défense
Skyscraper office buildings in France
Office buildings completed in 1970
Buildings and structures demolished in 2020
Former skyscrapers
Demolished buildings and structures in Paris
20th-century architecture in France